William J. Walsh may refer to:

 William Walsh (archbishop of Dublin) (William Joseph Walsh, 1841–1921), Roman Catholic Archbishop of Dublin
 William J. Walsh (politician) (William Joseph Walsh, 1880–1948), politician in Newfoundland
 Billy Walsh (curler) (William James Walsh, 1917–1971), Canadian curler